The Bersa 83 is a double-action pistol chambered for 9x17mm Browning Short (.380 ACP), and manufactured by Bersa between 1988 and 1994. It is a very popular pistol because it is compact, accurate, reliable, inexpensive, and an excellent choice for self-defense and concealed carry.

The Model 83 replaced the 383 DA in 1989, discarding an external slide catch in favor of an internal system: to release a slide from lock-back, the user had only to pull the slide back a bit further, and thence release it to allow full return to battery.

The Model 83 was in production for five years, after which the aluminium-frame, single-stack 
Series 95 was introduced, followed very shortly by Bersa's present Thunder Series of pistols including the Thunder 380 and its variants.

References 

Semi-automatic pistols of Argentina
.380 ACP semi-automatic pistols
Bersa firearms